York Galleria is an enclosed, indoor shopping mall located just northeast of York, Pennsylvania at the intersection of U.S. Route 30 and Pennsylvania Route 24. The anchor stores are Boscov's, Gold's Gym, H&M, Marshalls, and Hollywood Casino York. There is one vacant anchor store that was once The Bon-Ton, and the upper level of a former Sears store remains vacant.

Restaurants
The food court on the upper level contains counter service restaurants. The mall's only sit-down restaurant, Ruby Tuesday, closed in 2008. A Red Robin restaurant opened in the fall of 2014 in the mall's east-side parking lot and a Texas Roadhouse restaurant is also located near the east side of the mall.

Tenancy changes
In 1999, three new retail stores opened next to York Galleria: Target, Kohl's, and Michaels. Kohl's would officially open on April 16, 1999. Target opened next to Kohl's on October 10, 1999.

New stores were added at the mall in 2014 including Francesca's and rue21. In March 2014, the mall's owner, Tennessee-based CBL & Associates Properties, listed the mall for sale at an undisclosed price.  In January 2015, it was announced that JCPenney would be closing as part of a plan to close 39 under-performing stores nationwide.  In December 2016, H&M moved into space that had included part of the closed JCPenney store as well as the former Bath & Body Works location. Gold's Gym opened in mid-2017 in what had been the rest of JCPenney's lower level, and in late April 2018, Marshalls opened in part of the available space above the gym.

On April 19, 2018, it was announced that The Bon-Ton would be closing, as the chain was going out of business. All Bon-Ton stores were to be closed "within a few months" after that April announcement. Bon-Ton at York Galleria was fully closed by the end of August 2018.

On April 26, 2018, it was announced that Sears would be closing its York Galleria store in August 2018. Sears' communications director said it involved an acceleration of their previously announced closings of unprofitable stores, related to "store space and productivity".

On November 2, 2020, mall owner CBL Properties filed for Chapter 11 bankruptcy, though said its shopping centers will remain open.

Hollywood Casino York
According to Springettsbury Township officials in February 2018, Penn National Gaming expressed interest in the York Galleria area as a potential location for a mini-casino. The casino operator won the right from the Pennsylvania Gaming Control Board to build or renovate such a facility, with up to 750 slot machines and plans for 30 table games, in the south central part of the state – specifically, within  of Yoe.

The township solicitor said Penn National Gaming was looking at the first floor of the Sears property. A public hearing was held in late July 2018 for feedback on proposed ordinance changes for a potential gambling facility. Many expressed disapproval of a local casino and no one spoke in favor of the casino during the hearing. A township supervisor said residents have separately informed him of support, and after the hearing, supervisors approved related changes to the ordinances.

Penn National Gaming had a September 2018 deadline to apply to the control board to open a mini-casino in York County, and confirmed that month its selection of York Galleria's former Sears store as such a site, filing an application with the Gaming Control Board on September 12, 2018. A public hearing was held on November 1, with 14 speakers including four current and former township supervisors.  One resident, who said 38 neighbors shared his opinion, expressed his opposition to the casino; all others who spoke were for it.

As of February 2019, the proposal remained subject to a final closed-to-the-public board hearing, at which Penn National would make a presentation. As of June 2019, Penn National was still waiting for confirmation of a date for their presentation, with the delay being attributed to this first test of state gambling laws changed in 2017, as well as the prospective casino's being the first that would be placed in a mall. A control board spokesman said a license was expected by the end of the 2019, and a Penn National spokesman said construction would begin as soon as possible after such approval, with completion estimated 12 to 18 months thereafter.

In August 2019, Springettsbury Township supervisors voted their approval of Penn National's redevelopment plans for Hollywood Casino York. In October 2019, a Penn National spokesman gave the fourth quarter of 2020 as a target opening date, and the mall owner began some work on the site in anticipation of control board approval. On December 18, 2019, the Pennsylvania Gaming Control Board granted Penn National Gaming a license for the casino. Penn National suspended construction in March 2020 due to the coronavirus pandemic and as of August 2020, opening was projected for the second half of 2021. In April 2021, opening was set for August, and hiring had begun for casino employees. The casino opened on August 12, 2021, to long lines of customers.

See also
List of shopping malls in Pennsylvania

References

External links

Buildings and structures in York County, Pennsylvania
CBL Properties
Gambling in Pennsylvania
Shopping malls in Pennsylvania
Shopping malls established in 1989
Springettsbury Township, York County, Pennsylvania